Jackeo Relang is a Marshallese diplomat. He served as the permanent representative of the Marshall Islands to the United Nations in New York beginning in 1999.  He  served as chairman of the Marshall Islands delegation to the UN Conference on HIV/AIDS in 2001.

Education
Relang is a 1995 graduate of Brigham Young University–Hawaii.

Sources
statements by Marshall Islands government figures
UN listing of heads of delegations to HIV/AIDS conference

References

Marshallese diplomats
Permanent Representatives of the Marshall Islands to the United Nations
Brigham Young University–Hawaii alumni
Living people
Year of birth missing (living people)